Joujouka is a Japanese big beat project from Tokyo formed by Takeshi Isogai and Tsuyoshi Suzuki.

Discography
Joujouka (Matsuri Productions 1998)
New Asians (Psy-Harmonics / Radiosonic Records 2002)
Are You Elovetric? (Mad Skippers / Radiosonic Records 2003)
re-MODEL (Mad Skippers / Radiosonic Records 2004)
Never Look Back (Mad Skippers / Digilla / Psy-Harmonics 2006)

Other works
Rez — (2001), (SEGA Entertainment, Inc., UGA): Interactive music for the cyberpunk-themed music shooter.

External links
 Official website

Techno music groups
Trance music groups
Japanese pop music groups
Japanese electronic music groups